Supreme Courts Reports is the official publication of the reportable decisions of the Supreme Court of India. It is  being published weekly since the inception of the Supreme Court of India in 1950. It is published under the authority of the Supreme Court of India by the Controller of Publications, Government of India, Delhi.

References

External links 
 

Government gazettes of India
Weekly newspapers published in India
Magazines established in 1950